In probability theory and statistics, the beta prime distribution (also known as inverted beta distribution or beta distribution of the second kind) is an absolutely continuous probability distribution. If  has a beta distribution, then the odds  has a beta prime distribution.

Definitions 

 

where B is the Beta function.

The cumulative distribution function is

 

where I is the regularized incomplete beta function.

While the related beta distribution is the conjugate prior distribution of the parameter of a Bernoulli distribution expressed as a probability, the beta prime distribution is the conjugate prior distribution of the parameter of a Bernoulli distribution expressed in odds. The distribution is a Pearson type VI distribution.

Its mean is  if  (if  the mean is infinite, in other words it has no well defined mean) and its variance is  if .

For , the k-th moment  is given by

For  with  this simplifies to

The cdf can also be written as

where  is the Gauss's hypergeometric function 2F1 .

Alternative parameterization 

The beta prime distribution may also be reparameterized in terms of its mean μ > 0 and precision ν > 0 parameters ( p. 36).

Consider the parameterization μ = α/(β-1) and ν = β- 2, i.e., α = μ( 1 + ν) and
β = 2 + ν. Under this parameterization
E[Y] = μ and Var[Y] = μ(1 + μ)/ν.

Generalization 
Two more parameters can be added to form the generalized beta prime distribution :

 shape (real) 
 scale (real)

having the probability density function:

 

with mean

 

and mode

 

Note that if p = q = 1 then the generalized beta prime distribution reduces to the standard beta prime distribution. 

This generalization can be obtained via the following invertible transformation.

Compound gamma distribution 
The compound gamma distribution is the generalization of the beta prime when the scale parameter, q is added, but where p = 1. It is so named because it is formed by compounding two gamma distributions:

where  is the gamma pdf with shape  and inverse scale . 

The mode, mean and variance of the compound gamma can be obtained by multiplying the  mode and mean in the above infobox by q and the variance by q2.

(This gives one way to generate random variates with compound gamma, or beta prime distributions. Another is via the ratio of independent gamma variates, as shown below.)

Properties 
If  then .
If  then .

More generally, let  iid variables following the same beta prime distribution, i.e.

Related distributions 
If  has an F-distribution, then , or equivalently, . 
If  then .
If  then .
For gamma distribution parametrization I: 
If  are independent, then . Note  are all scale parameters for their respective distributions.
For gamma distribution parametrization II: 
If  are independent, then . The  are rate parameters, while  is a scale parameter.
The  are rate parameters for the gamma distributions, but  is the scale parameter for the beta prime. 
 the Dagum distribution
 the Singh–Maddala distribution.
 the log logistic distribution.
The beta prime distribution is a special case of the type 6 Pearson distribution.
If X has a Pareto distribution with minimum  and shape parameter , then .
If X has a Lomax distribution, also known as a Pareto Type II distribution, with shape parameter  and scale parameter , then .
If X has a standard Pareto Type IV distribution with shape parameter  and inequality parameter , then , or equivalently, .
The inverted Dirichlet distribution is a generalization of the beta prime distribution.
If , then  has a generalized logistic distribution. More generally, if , then  has a scaled and shifted generalized logistic distribution.

Notes

References 

 Johnson, N.L., Kotz, S., Balakrishnan, N. (1995). Continuous Univariate Distributions, Volume 2 (2nd Edition), Wiley. 
 

 MathWorld article

Continuous distributions
Compound probability distributions